Neosphaerocera is a genus of flies belonging to the family Lesser Dung flies.

Species
N. boraceiensis Mourgues-Schurter, 1981
N. breviradiata (Papp, 1978)
N. flavicoxa (Malloch, 1925)
N. diadelpha Mourgues-Schurter, 1981
N. novaeteutoniae Mourgues-Schurter, 1981
N. paraflavicoxa (Papp, 1978)
N. parvula (Papp, 1978)
N. richardsi (Kim, 1968)
N. similis (Kim, 1972)

References

Sphaeroceridae
Diptera of North America
Diptera of South America
Sphaeroceroidea genera